Mitella is a genus of flowering plants known as miterworts or bishop's caps. Mitella species are native to temperate and arctic North America and Asia.

Description
Mitella includes perennials growing from a scaly rhizome, bearing wide heart- or spade-shaped leaves near their bases and flowers with five petals in a long raceme or spike.

Etymology
The genus name means "little mitre", from Latin mitra with the diminutive suffix -ella, since the flowers are said to resemble bishop's headdresses. In Classical Latin use, however, mitella means "female headdress" or "sling". Latin mitra comes from Greek  "girdle", "headband", or "turban".

Species
Species include:
Mitella breweri - Brewer's miterwort
Mitella caulescens - slightstemmed miterwort
Mitella diphylla - twoleaf miterwort
Mitella diversifolia - angleleaf miterwort
Mitella nuda - naked miterwort
Mitella ovalis - coastal miterwort
Mitella pentandra - fivestamen miterwort
Mitella prostrata - creeping bishop's cap
Mitella stauropetala - smallflower miterwort
Mitella trifida - threepart miterwort

References

External links
Jepson's Manual Treatment

 
Saxifragaceae genera